Hingham is a town in metropolitan Greater Boston on the South Shore of the U.S. state of Massachusetts in northern Plymouth County. At the 2020 census, the population was 24,284. Hingham is known for its colonial history and location on Boston Harbor. The town was named after Hingham, Norfolk, England, and was first settled by English colonists in 1633.

History 

The town of Hingham was dubbed "Bare Cove" by the first colonizing English in 1633, but two years later was incorporated as a town under the name "Hingham." The land on which Hingham was settled was deeded to the English by the Wampanoag sachem Wompatuck in 1655. The town was within Suffolk County from its founding in 1643 until 1803, and Plymouth County from 1803 to the present. The eastern part of the town split off to become Cohasset in 1770. The town was named for Hingham, a market town in the English county of Norfolk, East Anglia, whence most of the first colonists came, including Abraham Lincoln's ancestor Samuel Lincoln (1622–1690), his first American ancestor, who came to Massachusetts in 1637. A statue of President Lincoln adorns the area adjacent to downtown Hingham Square.

Hingham was born of religious dissent. Many of the original founders were forced to flee their native town in Norfolk with both their vicars, Rev. Peter Hobart and Rev. Robert Peck, when they fell afoul of the strict doctrines of Anglican England. Peck was known for what the eminent Norfolk historian Rev. Francis Blomefield called his "violent schismatical spirit". Peck lowered the chancel railing of the church, in accord with Puritan sentiment that the Anglican church of the day was too removed from its parishioners. He also antagonized ecclesiastical authorities with other forbidden practices.

Hobart, born in Hingham, Norfolk, in 1604 and, like Peck, a graduate of Magdalene College, Cambridge, sought shelter from the prevailing discipline of the high church among his fellow Puritans. The cost to those who emigrated was steep. They "sold their possessions for half their value," noted a contemporary account, "and named the place of their settlement after their natal town." (The cost to the place they left behind was also high: Hingham was forced to petition Parliament for aid, claiming that the departure of its most well-to-do citizens had left it hamstrung.)

While most of the early Hingham settlers came from Hingham and other nearby villages in East Anglia, a few Hingham settlers like Anthony Eames came from the West Country of England. The early settlers of Dorchester, Massachusetts, for instance, had come under the guidance of Rev. John White of Dorchester in Dorset, and some of them (like Eames) later moved to Hingham. Accounts from Hingham's earliest years indicate some friction between the disparate groups, culminating in a 1645 episode involving the town's "trainband", when some Hingham settlers supported Eames, and others supported Bozoan Allen, a prominent early Hingham settler and Hobart ally who came from King's Lynn in Norfolk, East Anglia. Prominent East Anglian Puritans like the Hobarts and the Cushings, for instance, were used to holding sway in matters of governance. Eventually the controversy became so heated that John Winthrop and Thomas Dudley were drawn into the fray; minister Hobart threatened to excommunicate Eames.

The bitter trainband controversy dragged on for several years, culminating in stiff fines. Eventually a weary Eames, who was in his mid-fifties when the controversy began and who had served Hingham as first militia captain, a selectman, and Deputy in the General Court, threw in the towel and moved to nearby Marshfield where he again served as Deputy and emerged as a leading citizen, despite his brush with the Hingham powers-that-be.

Although the town was incorporated in 1635, the colonists didn't get around to negotiating purchase from the Wampanoag, the Native American tribe in the region, until three decades later. On July 4, 1665, the tribe's chief sachem, Josiah Wompatuck, sold the township to Capt. Joshua Hobart (brother of Rev. Peter Hobart) and Ensign John Thaxter (father of Col. Samuel Thaxter), representatives of Hingham's colonial residents. Having occupied the land for 30 years, the Englishmen presumably felt entitled to a steep discount.
The sum promised Josiah Wompatuck for the land encompassing Hingham was to be paid by two Hingham landowners: Lieut. John Smith and Deacon John Leavitt, who had been granted  on Hingham's Turkey Hill earlier that year. Now the two men were instructed to deliver payment for their  grant to Josiah the chief Sachem. The grant to Smith and Leavitt — who together bought other large tracts from the Native Americans for themselves and their partners—was "on condition that they satisfy all the charge about the purchase of the town's land of Josiah—Indian sagamore, both the principal purchase and all the other charge that hath been about it". With that payment the matter was considered settled.

The third town clerk of Hingham was Daniel Cushing, who emigrated to Hingham from Hingham, Norfolk, with his father Matthew in 1638. Cushing's meticulous records of early Hingham enabled subsequent town historians to reconstruct much of early Hingham history as well as that of the early families. Cushing was rather unusual in that he included the town's gossip along with the more conventional formal record-keeping.

Geography 

Hingham is bordered on the east by Cohasset, and Scituate, on the south by Norwell and Rockland, on the west by Weymouth, and on the north by Hingham Bay and Hull. Cohasset and Weymouth are in Norfolk County; the other towns, like Hingham itself, are in Plymouth County.

Hingham lies along the southwest corner of Boston Harbor. The bay leads to a harbor, which cuts a U-shaped indentation into the northern shore of the town. The town is separated from Hull by the Weir River and its tributary, which leads to the Straits Pond. The northern third of the town's border with Weymouth consists of the Weymouth Back River, which empties out into Hingham Bay. There are several other small ponds and brooks throughout town. The town also has several forests and parks, the largest of which, Wompatuck State Park, spreads into the neighboring towns of Cohasset, Scituate and Norwell. There are also several conservation areas throughout town; the portion of the Boston Harbor Islands National Recreation Area in Hingham includes Bumpkin Island, Button Island, Langlee Island, Ragged Island, Sarah Island and the World's End Reservation, which juts out into the bay. There is a marina along the mouth of the Weymouth Back River, and a public beach along the harbor.

Demographics 

The U.S. Census Bureau estimates, there are 24,284 people and 8,873 households in the town. The racial makeup of the town was 97.5% White, 0.40% Black or African American, 0.04% Native American, 0.88% Asian, 0.02% Pacific Islander, 0.22% from other races, and 0.95% from two or more races. Hispanic or Latino of any race were 0.75% of the population.

There were 7,189 households, out of which 37.8% had children under the age of 18 living with them, 65.7% were married couples living together, 8.5% had a female householder with no husband present, and 23.8% were non-families. 21.0% of all households were made up of individuals, and 10.1% had someone living alone who was 65 years of age or older. The average household size was 2.72 and the average family size was 3.19.

In the town, the population was spread out, with 27.7% under the age of 18, 4.3% from 18 to 24, 26.3% from 25 to 44, 27.5% from 45 to 64, and 14.1% who were 65 years of age or older. The median age was 40 years. For every 100 females, there were 89.5 males. For every 100 females age 18 and over, there were 85.6 males.

The median household income in the town was $142,435 (mean household income was $206,876), and the median family income was $198,900 (mean family income was $265,292) in 2019. Males had a median income of $66,802 versus $41,370 for females. The per capita income in 2019 for the town was $78,301. About 2.4% of families and 3.5% of the population were below the poverty line, including 4.7% of those under age 18 and 3.1% of those age 65 or over.

Economy

Top employers
According to the Town's 2017 Comprehensive Annual Financial Report, the top employers in the town are:

Government

On the national level, Hingham is a part of Massachusetts's 8th congressional district, and is currently represented by Stephen F. Lynch. The state's senior member of the United States Senate is Elizabeth Warren. The state's junior Senator is Ed Markey, who was elected in a special election in 2013 to fill the seat vacated by John Kerry being appointed as United States Secretary of State.

On the state level, Hingham is represented in the Massachusetts House of Representatives as a part of the Third Plymouth district, by Joan Meschino. The district also includes Cohasset, Hull and North Scituate. The town is represented in the Massachusetts Senate as a part of the Plymouth and Norfolk district, by Patrick O'Connor. The district also includes the towns of Cohasset, Duxbury, Hull, Marshfield, Norwell, Scituate and Weymouth. The town is patrolled on a secondary basis by the First (Norwell) Barracks of Troop D of the Massachusetts State Police.

Hingham is governed on the local level by the open town meeting form of government, and is led by a town administrator and a three-member select board. The members of the board of selectmen are William Ramsey, Liz Klein, and Joe Fisher. The town hall is located in the former Central Junior High School building, which it moved into in 1995. The town has its own police and fire departments, with a central police station next to the town hall and fire houses located near the town common, in West Hingham, and in South Hingham. The town's nearest hospital is South Shore Hospital in Weymouth, where all emergency calls are sent. There are two post offices in town, one in downtown Hingham on North Street and another in South Hingham right on Route 53. The town's public library is located on Leavitt Street in Center Hingham, and is part of the Old Colony Library Network.

Infrastructure

Education
Hingham is home to seven public schools:
 Hingham High School
 South Shore Educational Collaborative
 Hingham Middle School
 East Elementary School
 Foster Elementary School
 Plymouth River Elementary School
 South Elementary School

Hingham is home to five private schools:
 Derby Academy
 Notre Dame Academy
 St. Paul School
 Old Colony Montessori School
 Su Escuela Language Academy

Transportation

A small portion of Route 3 passes through the southwest corner of town, with one exit in town and another at Route 228 just south of the town line. Routes 3A and 53 also cross through the town, the latter mirroring the path of Route 3. Route 228 passes from north to south in town; the rest all pass from west to east.

Public transportation is currently served by the commuter boat ferry service from the Hingham Shipyard to Rowes Wharf in downtown Boston, the MBTA's Bus Route 220, with Route 222 also passing through a small section of town, and the MBTA Commuter Rail to Boston South Station. Commuter rail has been restored along the Greenbush Line through Hingham. Trains stop at two stations in town; West Hingham and Nantasket Junction. As part of the MBTA's agreement to restore train service, a tunnel has been built to carry the commuter trains under historic Hingham Square. There were disputes in Hingham about whether to allow the train to pass through the town. Some people felt that Hingham is becoming less like a town and more like a small city. Others felt that the line would benefit the town. Ferries also run from Hingham Shipyard to several islands in Boston Harbor during the summer as well as to Pemberton Point, Hull. There is no air service in the town; the nearest airport is Logan International Airport in Boston as well as smaller public airports in Norwood and Marshfield.

Notable people 

Hingham's most famous line of citizens came from two unrelated families named Lincoln who emigrated to Massachusetts from the English county of Norfolk in the seventeenth century, from Hingham and Swanton Morley, respectively. A bridge in Hingham over Route 3, the Southeast Expressway, is named after American Revolutionary War General Benjamin Lincoln of the Swanton branch. General Lincoln is best remembered for accepting Cornwallis's sword of surrender at the Siege of Yorktown. But the most famous Hingham Lincoln never lived in the town: United States President and Civil War Commander-in-Chief Abraham Lincoln, descended from one of several Lincoln families who settled in Hingham—and unrelated to General Benjamin. A bronze statue, a replica of the famous sitting Lincoln Memorial in Washington D.C. sits at the foot of Lincoln Street at North Street.

 Tony Amonte, retired hockey player in the NHL
 John F. Andrew, 19th century United States Congressman
 Bill Belichick owns a house in Hingham in the Black Rock Country Club residential community
 Brian Boyle, current ice hockey player in the NHL
 Wilmon Brewer, lifelong Hingham author and philanthropist
 Marc Brown, author, illustrator, and creator of the children’s television show Arthur
 Prescott Bush Jr., brother of 41st President George H. W. Bush and Uncle of 43rd President George W. Bush
 Herbert L. Foss, recipient of the Medal of Honor in the Spanish–American War
 Bob Graham, former governor and senator from Florida and a 2004 presidential candidate currently resides part time in Hingham
 Harold Hackett, four-time U.S. Open tennis doubles champion
 Lloyd P. Jones, Bethlehem Steel executive and son of Willard F. Jones, resided with his family in Hingham while working at the Bethlehem Shipbuilding Corporation
 King Kelly 19th Century Baseball Hall of Famer. Given a home on Main Street, Hingham by loving fans of Boston.Slide, Kelly, Slide (Scarecrow Press 1996)
 Bruce H. Mann Professor and Husband of presidential candidate Elizabeth Warren
 David McCullough, author and historian resided part-time in Hingham
 Pierre McGuire, ice hockey analyst and former NHL coach and scout
 Marty McInnis, retired hockey player in the NHL
 Alice Merryweather, Olympic alpine skier
 Jay O'Brien, ice hockey player
 Dallas Lore Sharp, assistant librarian (1899–1902), assistant professor of English (1902–1909), and thereafter professor at Boston University, settled with his family (including Waitstill Sharp) in Hingham. As a writer, he became known through his charming magazine articles on native birds and small mammals and for his books. Much of his writing celebrated Hingham's natural beauty
Matty Beniers, current ice hockey player in the NHL. The first ever draft pick by the Seattle Kraken
Robert Perry Harris V,- 2017 Lacrosse State Championship - Hingham High School - Goalie

References

External links 

 
 Hingham Historical Society
 Hingham Public Library
 Early Settlers of Hingham, History of Hingham, 1893
 History of the Town of Hingham, Massachusetts, Vol. I, Thomas Tracy Bouvé and others, Published by the Town, 1893
 Hingham's Civil War monuments at Massachusetts Civil War Monuments Project

 
1633 establishments in Massachusetts
New England Puritanism
Populated coastal places in Massachusetts
Populated places established in 1633
Towns in Massachusetts
Towns in Plymouth County, Massachusetts